Bejuco may refer to:
Guaco (also called bejuco), a climbing plant
Bejuco, Panama
Bejuco District, Costa Rica

See also
Bejucos River, Mexico